Amy King (née Hill; born 4 July 1995) is a British former racing cyclist from Newport, Wales. She was a member of the record breaking, gold medal winning, British team pursuit squad at the Juniors world championships in 2013.

Career
On 8 August 2013, at the Sir Chris Hoy Velodrome in Glasgow, King competed at the UCI Juniors Track World Championships. She was part of Britain's Team Pursuit squad which also included Hayley Jones, Emily Kay and Emily Nelson. In the qualifying heat, they broke the senior world record which had only been set a few weeks previously at the European Track Championships, setting a new time of 4:38.708. In the final, they broke the record once more, with a time of 4:35.085, beating Russia to become world champions.

King represented Wales at the 2014 Commonwealth Games in Glasgow.

Major results

2011
 2nd Individual pursuit, National Youth Track Championships
2012
 3rd Points race, National Junior Track Championships
2013
 1st  Team pursuit, UCI Juniors Track World Championships (with Hayley Jones, Emily Kay & Emily Nelson)
 1st  Points race, National Junior Track Championships
 Ghent International Junior Track Meeting
3rd Team pursuit (with Rebecca Hunt and Manon Lloyd)
3rd Omnium
2015
 8th Women's Tour de Yorkshire
2018
 9th Omloop der Kempen

References

External links 

 
 

1995 births
Living people
Sportspeople from Newport, Wales
Welsh female cyclists